HD 149143, formally named Rosalíadecastro, is a star located in the Ophiuchus constellation that has spectral type of G0 located at a distance of 240 light-years from us. Its apparent magnitude is 7.9 (a binocular object) and the absolute magnitude is 3.9.

Planetary system
The planet that orbits it was discovered by the N2K Consortium, during their search for short-period gas giant planets around metal-rich stars. The planet was independently discovered by the Elodie metallicity-biased search for transiting Hot Jupiters.

Naming
On December 17, 2019, as part of the IAU's NameExoWorlds project, the star HD 149143 was given the name Rosalíadecastro in honour of the Spanish poet Rosalía de Castro, who was a significant figure of Galician culture and prominent Spanish writer, whose work often referenced the night and celestial objects.

See also

 HD 109749
 HD 150706
 List of proper names of stars
 Lists of exoplanets

References

G-type main-sequence stars
149143
081022
Ophiuchus (constellation)
Planetary systems with one confirmed planet
Durchmusterung objects
Planetary transit variables
Rosalíadecastro